Nightwatch is a 1997 American horror thriller film directed by Ole Bornedal and starring Ewan McGregor, Patricia Arquette, Josh Brolin and Nick Nolte. It was written by Bornedal and Steven Soderbergh. It is a remake of the 1994 Danish film of the same name, which was also directed by Bornedal.

Plot
Law student Martin Bells is hired as a night watchman at a hospital morgue. A string of gruesome prostitute murders committed by a necrophiliac serial killer quickly point to him as the lead suspect in the investigation carried out by Inspector Thomas Cray. At the same time, Martin slowly discovers clues that point to the real perpetrator.

Cast
 Ewan McGregor as Martin Bells
 Patricia Arquette as Catherine
 Josh Brolin as James Gallman
 Lauren Graham as Marie
 Nick Nolte as Inspector Thomas Cray
 Brad Dourif as Duty Doctor
 Alix Koromzay as Joyce
 Anais Evans as Leanne
 Lonny Chapman as Old Watchman
 Larry Cedar as Waiter (uncredited)
 Sandra Hess as Student (uncredited)
 John C. Reilly as Deputy Inspector Bill Davis (uncredited)

Production
After the original Nattevagten  found critical acclaim in 1994, director Ole Bornedal was hired by Dimension Films (who had recently purchased the distribution rights for Nattevagten) to come to the United States and remake the film. The remake was intended to be the first of three films Bornedal would direct for Miramax, the parent company of Dimension.

Principal photography for the remake took place in Culver City, California and UCLA. Nightwatch took a year to complete, due to a series of test screenings and reshoots Miramax ordered. Changes made by Miramax to the finished cut included reducing the role of James's girlfriend Marie, and adding a "more satisfying final scene". Bornedal went on to state that "the actual shooting of Nightwatch was terrific, everything was totally wonderful, and I was free to do as I pleased, but everything suddenly became extremely complicated during the post-production phase".

The co-writer of the film's script, Steven Soderbergh, is described as having "sanitized" the original 1994 script. For example, in the Danish version, there is a scene at a restaurant where the character Jens orders a prostitute to give Martin a blowjob. In the remake, Jens (now known as James) instead orders the prostitute to give Martin a handjob. Also added by Soderbergh were American pop culture references, including a scene where Martin mutters: "It's just like one of those movies on the USA Network, the hero sees something weird and no one will believe him". Soderbergh himself noted his frustrations at how nearly a year after shooting had begun, he was being forced to provide new script pages for reshoots that were going to be detrimental to the quality of the film.

An opening credit sequence was designed by Kyle Cooper, who had also worked on the opening credits for other films, such as Seven and Mimic. It contained a photo montage of women with their eyes scratched out; as the killer's trademark in the film was to remove the eyes of his victims. Cooper then shot these images submerged in water, to give them an added layer of distance and make them ripple spectrally on the screen.

Music
Nightwatch'''s background score was handled by Danish composer Joachim Holbek, who, like many of the crew, was also involved in the original version. When Nightwatch was in the process of being re-edited during 1997, Scream composer Marco Beltrami was brought in to rescore several scenes. He also composed the score for a newly shot scene at the beginning of the film, involving the killer and a prostitute. While Martin is working at the morgue, there are sequences where he listens to licensed songs from alternative rock/electronic artists The Chemical Brothers, R.E.M. and Transister. The closing credits featured the song "Pain" by Super 8, an alternative rock band briefly signed to Hollywood Records in the mid-90s. Originally, songs by the band Garbage also appeared throughout, but they were later removed in post-production. To coincide with the film's debut in 1997, an accompanying soundtrack album was going to be released by Hollywood Records. However, when the American theatrical release got delayed, plans for the soundtrack album were ultimately abandoned.

Release
In the United States, Nightwatch was originally scheduled to come out in late 1996. Due to the extended production, it was pushed back to several dates, including spring/summer 1997 and October 1997 (as suggested by the film's 1997 copyright year), before eventually getting an American theatrical run in April 1998. It has been claimed that the October 1997 release date was cancelled to avoid competition with another Ewan McGregor film, A Life Less Ordinary, to be released that same month. While these delays were occurring, the film received its worldwide premiere during February 1997 at Málaga International Week of Fantastic Cinema in Spain and at the American Film Market in Santa Monica, California, garnering reviews in select publications during the following months.

ReceptionNightwatch received mostly negative reviews from critics. On Rotten Tomatoes it has a 28% rating based on 29 reviews from critics. Audiences polled by CinemaScore gave the film an average grade of "C−" on an A+ to F scale.

In an April 1998 review, Stephen Holden of The New York Times criticized Nightwatch for "spending so much time churning up eerie atmospheric effects that it doesn't have time to develop its preposterous story in which Martin finds himself accused of the murders". Holden also called the film's climax "clumsily prolonged".  Roger Ebert's review states that "this film depends so heavily on horror effects, blind alleys, false leads and red herrings that eventually watching it stops being an experience and becomes an exercise". In a review for Variety, Leonard Klady claimed: "It’s not ideas that are lacking, but the connective tissue to give them life. The absence of even a vague unifying spirit reduces Nightwatch almost to the level of an intellectual "snuff" film". Klady stated that he believed the film's cast had been underutilized, going on to write that "Patricia Arquette is squandered in the girlfriend role, and Brolin has more energy than focus in a badly conceived part". In spite of this, he praised Alix Koromzay's minor role as "a vulnerable and tragic teenage hooker". Marc Savlov from The Austin Chronicle commented that "Arquette and Brolin seem as though they're off in their own private universe".Los Angeles Times writer Jack Matthews compared Nightwatch to the 1995 thriller Seven, mentioning that "like Seven, it mixes the styles of suspense, horror and film noir, using murky lighting, odd angles and deliberately paced camera movements to create an atmosphere of constant dread". But he went on to write that "at least [Seven's] villain was on a mission--to punish violators of the Seven Deadly Sins--that would be personally threatening to most members of the audience. The psycho in Nightwatch is a necrophiliac, the scourge of the county morgue, with the peculiar habit of killing and mutilating prostitutes before having sex with them".

A more positive review at the time came from Paul Clinton of CNN. He said that "Nightwatch is a fairly good effort" and that "the cinematography by Dan Laustsen and the lighting are excellent and add immensely to the overall tension of the piece". However, he too criticized the climax of the film, referring to it as "cartoonish". Like Clinton, Malcolm Johnson of the Hartford Courant commented on the lighting of the film in his review, writing: "True to his Scandinavian background, Bornedal has shot Nightwatch largely in semi-darkness, beginning with a violent murder in a prostitute's bedroom".

Legacy and comparisons to Nattevagten
Comparing the differences in tone between Nattevagten and Nightwatch, Tommy Gustafsson notes in his 2015 book Nordic Film Genre that "while the [1997] Hollywood remake opens immediately with a gratuitously gruesome murder, the 1994 Danish version builds a eerie mood much more slowly and is only a pure thriller in its last third". AllMovie claim "artistic elements of the original gave way to name actors, slicker production values, and the more conventional grindhouse genre approach, opening with a brutal prostitute murder in a pre-credit sequence".

Michael Obel, who worked as a producer on both the original and the remake, remarked in 2002: "The Danish version is better, we can surely agree on that. Several test screenings and re-editing ended up in a version that is less than optimum". In a 1999 interview, actor Nick Nolte revealed he had never seen the 1997 film, stating: "As the studio got it, they realized that they had a European-paced film, and they kept hacking at it and hacking at it". Ewan McGregor similarly remarked at the time that "this was the perfect example of a film they would not leave alone. There were constant reshoots, including the ending, and they took all the interesting stuff out, making it bland. The original concept was the reason I accepted it in the first place. I had massive strands of the character removed, which is insulting". In 2019, McGregor again spoke out against Miramax's post-production interference on Nightwatch, claiming Harvey Weinstein "ruined that film" and that Weinstein "made us reshoot everything — everything that was interesting about the film he replaced".

In 2020, the website Flickering Myth included it on their list of "10 Essential Forgotten Films". They wrote the film is "filled to the brim with atmosphere and quirky characters" and that it "has aged well". In 2019, Rolling Stone ranked all 56 films Ewan McGregor had starred in at that point, placing Nightwatch 49th, and writing, "the whole thing alternates between campy grotesque and chilly humorlessness, and while McGregor brings conviction to his part, he’s seems to exist only in relation to the other characters in the film." In 2022, Looper ranked all 58 Ewan McGregor films, also placing Nightwatch'' at 49th. They state that, "McGregor is far from terrible here, but he gets let down by shoddy filmmaking. The likes of Patricia Arquette and Josh Brolin are also misused and underutilized."

Awards

References

External links
 
 
 
 

1997 films
1997 horror films
1997 crime thriller films
1990s psychological thriller films
American slasher films
American horror thriller films
American remakes of Danish films
Horror film remakes
American serial killer films
American crime thriller films
Films about security and surveillance
Films directed by Ole Bornedal
Films with screenplays by Steven Soderbergh
Necrophilia in film
1990s English-language films
1990s American films